Julia Wojciechowska (5 May 1915 – 5 May 1986) was a Polish gymnast. She competed in the women's artistic team all-around event at the 1936 Summer Olympics.

References

1915 births
1986 deaths
Polish female artistic gymnasts
Olympic gymnasts of Poland
Gymnasts at the 1936 Summer Olympics
People from Mielec
Sportspeople from Podkarpackie Voivodeship